Rainer Dörrzapf (born 6 March 1950) is a German weightlifter. He competed at the 1968 Summer Olympics and the 1972 Summer Olympics.

References

External links
 

1950 births
Living people
German male weightlifters
Olympic weightlifters of West Germany
Weightlifters at the 1968 Summer Olympics
Weightlifters at the 1972 Summer Olympics
Sportspeople from Ludwigshafen
20th-century German people